Carlos Castillo, knows by his artistic name as Carlos Arraíz is a Venezuelan actor and model.

He began his career while still a student at the Universidad Central de Venezuela where he joined the theater group El Chichón, and since then, he participated in various stage plays such as La Caja Mágica, Los Chicos del 69, El Principito, La Sirenita, Vaselina: el musical, Se busca corazón among others.

Carlos has won several awards, such as the TIN Teatro Infantil Nacional 2001 and again in 2006.

In 2009, he was selected to be the exclusive voice of AXN Channel. In 2016, he joined the cast of the third season of the musical play A Todo Volumen

Filmography

Television
Archivos del más allá (2003-2004) 
La CQ (2012) as Eleuterio
Cosita rica (2003) as Farmacéutico
Guayoyo Express (2005) as Locuaz Camargo Parle
El gato tuerto (2007) as Oscarde Coromoto Sabroso Humpiérrez
La mujer perfecta (2010) as Marlon Pájaro
Los secretos de Lucía (2013) as Tigre
Escándalos El doble (2016) as Hernán "El lobo" Ferrer

References

External links
 

Year of birth missing (living people)
Living people
Venezuelan male actors
Venezuelan male voice actors
Venezuelan male models
Male actors from Caracas